This is a list of public art in and around Trafalgar Square in the City of Westminster, London.

Charing Cross, at the junction of Strand and Whitehall, was the site of the first public monument in what is now the City of Westminster, the cross commissioned by Edward I late in the 13th century in memory of his queen, Eleanor of Castile. Destroyed by order of the Long Parliament in 1647, the Eleanor cross was replaced after the Restoration by the equestrian statue of Charles I by Hubert Le Sueur, the oldest public sculpture now standing in the borough. In 1865 a facsimile of the cross was erected in the forecourt of Charing Cross railway station. Charing Cross was declared the official centre of London in 1831 and a plaque marking this status was installed near Le Sueur's statue in 1955.

Immediately to the north of Charing Cross lies Trafalgar Square, one of London's most famous public spaces. Conceived as part of John Nash's urban improvements, the square was initially developed from the 1820s onwards. Its centrepiece, Nelson's Column, was constructed in 1839–1842. Charles Barry's 1840 redesign of the square provided plinths for equestrian monuments to George IV and William IV, but sufficient funds were never raised for the latter statue. Most of the memorials since added have had a military or naval flavour, an exception being the statue of the physician Edward Jenner, erected in 1858 but moved to Kensington Gardens only four years later. Another work which originally stood on the square is Hamo Thornycroft's statue of General Gordon; this was removed during World War II and reinstalled on the Victoria Embankment in 1953.

Since 1999 the formerly empty fourth plinth on Trafalgar Square has become London's most prominent showcase for temporary new sculpture.

Charing Cross

Charing Cross station

Cockspur Street

St Martin's Place

National Portrait Gallery

The architectural sculpture of the National Portrait Gallery, on St Martin's Place and Irving Street, is the work of the sculptor Frederick C. Thomas. The three busts over the original main entrance are of the principal supporters of the foundation of the gallery, and the remaining busts are of other biographical writers, historians and portraitists. The architect Ewan Christian's original design for the gallery included a frieze of figures from British history on the top storey, but this was abandoned to save money.

Trafalgar Square

National Gallery

The architectural sculpture of the National Gallery was originally intended for John Nash's Marble Arch. Construction of the latter was begun in 1827 but ceased after the death of George IV in 1830.

St Martin-in-the-Fields

South Africa House

See also
 Fourth plinth, Trafalgar Square
 Statue of Edward Jenner, London
 Statue of General Gordon

References

Bibliography

 

 

 

 

 

 

 

 

 

 

 

Trafalgar Square
Public art